Kurt Ferdinand Krieger (September 16, 1926 – August 16, 1970), nicknamed "Dutch", was an Austrian-born American professional baseball player and right-handed pitcher who appeared in three Major League Baseball games for the St. Louis Cardinals during the seasons of  and . Born in the town of Traisen, he was the first person born in post-1918 Austria, as of 2022, to play in the major leagues, although other MLB players were natives of the multiethnic 1867–1918 Austro-Hungarian Empire.

By , he had worked his way onto the 28-man, early-season roster of the MLB Cardinals. In his debut on April 21, he was called on in the ninth inning to finish a game at Crosley Field in which the Cardinals trailed the Cincinnati Reds 5–0. Although Krieger walked Grady Hatton, the first hitter he faced, then threw a wild pitch, he retired the next three men and held Cincinnati off the scoreboard.

In the majors, he worked in three games, all in relief; he did not earn a decision or a save, and ultimately allowed six hits, five bases on balls, and seven earned runs in five innings pitched, with three strikeouts and an earned run average of 12.60. His minor league career continued into 1954.

Kurt Krieger died in St. Louis on August 16, 1970, at age 43, and was interred in Affton, Missouri, in Sunset Memorial Park.

References

External links

1926 births
1970 deaths
Austrian emigrants to the United States
Baseball players from St. Louis
Columbus Red Birds players
Houston Buffaloes players
Lima Red Birds players
Lynchburg Cardinals players
Major League Baseball pitchers
Major League Baseball players from Austria
People from Lower Austria
Rochester Red Wings players
St. Louis Cardinals players
Syracuse Chiefs players
Terre Haute Phillies players
United States Army personnel of World War II
Washington University Bears baseball players